Tony Webster may refer to:

 Tony Webster (EastEnders), a character in British TV soap opera EastEnders
 Tony Webster (screenwriter) (1922–1987), American screenwriter
 Tony Webster, a journalist whose Twitter account was banned during the "Thursday Night Massacre"